Rudi Dekkers (born July 27, 1956) is a Dutch businessman, convicted drug trafficker, and former owner of Huffman Aviation, a flight school in Venice, Florida, who became the subject of worldwide attention on September 12, 2001, one day after September 11 attacks after it was revealed Dekkers had trained two of the 9/11 hijackers, Mohamed Atta, the ringleader, and Marwan al-Shehhi, both former students, who crashed respective flights, American Airlines Flight 11 and United Airlines Flight 175 into the Twin Towers of the World Trade Center.

Early life
Deekers was born on July 27, 1956, in Apeldoorn, Netherlands. He grew up in the Jordaan neighborhood of Amsterdam. Dekkers grew up poor in an abusive home where his father would routinely punish him. He would often run away from home at the age of eight wandering through the streets of Amsterdam. He worked as a housing broker in Ede selling three to four houses a week. In 1983, he met Bill Gates and as a result set up a computer business in the Netherlands via Miami, bypassing tax authorities, and becoming one of the first computer dealers in the Netherlands. In between working as a broker and the computer business, he obtained his pilot's license at Teuge Airport.

He moved to Florida in 1993. Prior to the attacks, Dekkers by his own estimate, declared that he was worth twelve million on paper in 2001. He owned a Dodge Viper and had a landing pad in front of his Naples, Florida, home. Prior to moving to the United States, Dekkers was accused by former business partners of defrauding them of tens of thousands of guilder. He had been convicted of tax fraud, and later acquitted on appeal. And faced sexual harassment allegations from a former female employee. A case that was later settled.

September 11 attacks
Dekkers purchased Huffman Aviation in 1999. At the time of purchase, the school had a fleet of twelve small aircraft. Huffman offered private pilot, instrument rating, Commercial pilot licence, Multi-Engine Ratings, and flight instructor training, but did not offer training on larger jet aircraft.

Atta and al-Shehhi had attended the school to learn how to fly small aircraft. The two first trained at Huffman in July 2001 after they first met with Dekkers while he was on a coffee break in his office at the school. In August, the school filed the M-1 student visa request forms for Atta and al-Shehhi to switch from tourist visas, to student visas, in order to allow them to enroll in the school's professional pilot program that would last from September 1, 2000, until September 1 the next year. The student visa requests were granted on July 17, 2001, for Atta, and August 9, 2001, for al-Shehhi. For a short while, during their time at the school, both Marwan and Atta lived with a company employee named Charlie Voss.

Following the attacks, media reports and the investigation into the attacks led the FBI to Huffman Aviation. The FBI seized records from the flight school which revealed that both Atta and al-Shehhi paid ten thousand dollars for two months of flight instruction. Dekkers cooperated with the FBI from the start with former FBI investigator Kerry Myers who said that "Rudi was very cooperative. He didn't require a subpoena, he didn't require a court order. He was a good American citizen." Meyers stated that evidence linking Ramzi bin al-Shibh, described as one of the people to be the possible 20th hijacker, to the attacks came from Dekkers' cooperation and records found from both hijackers. Dekkers also maintained that he did not feel guilty and he had made copies of their passports and their visas, but he said there were no red flags asserting "Nothing was out of the ordinary. We did our job."

Afterwards, Dekkers went bankrupt and was later divorced losing custody of his daughters. He also received death threats. Trouble also occurred with the Internal Revenue Service, lenders, and the Federal Aviation Administration.

In January 2002, Huffman Aviation again made headlines when the local paper sent a reporter onto its property, who managed to casually move between airplane cockpits, fuel tanks, and other "safety concerns" without anybody noticing or stopping him. In March, the school was cited for having left fuel trucks unlocked, with keys in the ignition, at the Venice Municipal Airport.

On February 24, 2002, Dekkers suspected someone tried to have him killed when piloting a helicopter he crashed into the Caloosahatchee River as the fuel lines were cut.

Since media attention focused on him, Dekkers enjoyed his time in the spotlight saying "The camera loves me." He had been criticized for his alleged lack of oversight at the school. He countered back with the United States' lax national border security and visa systems which would be confirmed when he found two approved visa applications from the U.S. Immigration and Naturalization Service for Atta and al-Shehhi in March 2002. After the attacks, he wound up losing four hundred thousand dollars, and most of his students who were primarily international later dropped out. A second school he operated in Naples, Florida, was closed after he was sued by a former business partner after defaulting on a series of loans, one of which accounted for $1.7 million.

Dekkers sold Huffman Aviation in 2003.

Dekkers stated in 2011 that the two men "never displayed any behaviors that would have labeled them as terrorists." And at one point during their training, "the two men were on the verge of being kicked out of the school because they did not appear to be taking their training seriously and were too busy fooling around and not listening to their instructors. They had to be warned, and went on to become average students." He would get along with al-Shehhi describing him as "a more likable person. He laughed and joked." However, Dekkers and his employees described Atta as "dead man walking" due to his "white face and no emotions and was a nasty person, very unfriendly. Dekkers stated that he didn't know what they were going to do and maintained his innocence, "I don't feel guilty at all. I couldn't do nothing about it. I wish I could be a hero. I think about this often. Why me? But that's fate. You can't turn away from fate, I guess."

Dekkers stated in 2016 that his "9/11" began on the morning of September 12 and that he no longer considers each year since the attack to be an anniversary rather he "lives 9/11 every day."

Personal life
In 2007, Dekkers sold swimming pools while living in a villa in a gated community in Fort Myers, Florida. He remarried to a Cuban woman, who later gave birth to their child. A year later the 2007–2008 financial crisis resulted in the Great Recession and the Florida housing market collapsed and lost his business. He previously ran a cellphone store in Naples, Florida. By 2011, Dekkers divorced again and was in severe financial shape. His house had been reclaimed by the bank facing eviction, unemployed, and illegally tapped electricity. He lived on food stamps and only ate once a day. He was chased literally by bailiffs who wanted to confiscate his car. His visa had expired and was in the country illegally.

In 2011, Dekkers published an autobiography, Guilty by Association, detailing his life, passion for flying, and his interactions with Atta and al-Shehhi.

Dekkers praised the killing of Osama bin Laden, "Like a lot of people, I wish I was the one. And bravo to everyone who was behind this. The head of the snake is gone."

On December 2, 2012, Dekkers was arrested on federal drug charges by the United States Department of Homeland Security in Houston after accepting a blue suitcase containing 18.7 kilograms of cocaine and 860 grams of heroin. He was sentenced to five years in prison after a year and a half in pre-trial detention.

Following his release from federal custody, Dekkers moved to the Dominican Republic.

On April 11, 2019, Dutch authorities arrested Dekkers Amsterdam Airport Schiphol with 118 swallowed scoops of cocaine. He was sentenced to seven months in prison, two of which were suspended, but fled during a furlough abroad. He returned to the country in June 2022 and was ordered by a court to serve the two months probation for coke smuggling, plus a month that he has not served due to his flight.

Dekkers was the subject of a 2021 three-part Dutch television documentary, Rudi - Achtervolgd door 9/11 (Rudi - Haunted by 9/11)

As of 2022, Dekkers lives in Medellín, Colombia, with his girlfriend Alexandra.

References

External links
 

1956 births
Living people
People from Apeldoorn
Businesspeople from Amsterdam
Dutch real estate brokers
Dutch aviators
Dutch flight instructors
Dutch drug traffickers
Helicopter pilots
Naturalized citizens of the United States
Dutch expatriates in the United States
Dutch expatriates in the Dominican Republic
Dutch expatriates in Colombia
People associated with the September 11 attacks
Prisoners and detainees of the United States federal government
Prisoners and detainees of the Netherlands
20th-century Dutch businesspeople
21st-century Dutch businesspeople